The 23rd Stockholm International Film Festival took place between 7 and 18 November 2012. American actor Peter Fonda was head of the jury. The Bronze Horse for best picture was won by the Australian/German film Lore, directed by Cate Shortland.

Feature Film sections

In competition 

The following films competed for the main prize, the Bronze Horse. The director of a film in the competition may not have made more than 3 films (this one included).

Open Zone 

The films in the Open Zone section competed for the FIPRESCI Award.

American Independents 

"Fresh Indies from the mavericks of American film".

Asian Images 

"A panorama from one of the most creative and interesting filmmaking areas in the world."

Latin Visions 

"The hottest features from the artistically vibrant countries in Latin America and Spain."

Spotlight: Power 

"This year the spotlight is on Power. Twelve ravishing films explore different shapes of power in politics, art and in the personal relationship."

Twilight Zone 

"Radical films exploring new contemporary cinematic subcultures and genres."

Documania 

"A selection of illuminating and experimental documentaries that centers on the contemporary, controversial and personal."

Juries 

Competition
 Peter Fonda, American actor (President)
 Anna Croneman, Swedish producer
 Karolina Ramqvist, Swedish writer
 Srđan Dragojević, Serbian director
 Antonio Campos, American director
 Malin Crépin, Swedish actress

FIPRESCI Award
 Dragan Jurak, Croatian film critic
 Margarita Chapatte, Spanish broadcaster
 Florian Vollmers, German film critic

Awards 

In Competition
 Bronze Horse for Best Picture - Lore by Cate Shortland
 Best Directorial debut - Benh Zeitlin for Beasts of the Southern Wild
 Best Screenplay - Andrew Dominik for Killing Them Softly
 Best Actress - Saskia Rosendahl for Lore
 Best Actor - Tim Roth for Broken
 Best Cinematography - Adam Arkapaw for Lore
 Best Music - Max Richter for Lore
Independent Awards
 FIPRESCI-Award - Everyday by Michael Winterbottom
 Telia Film Award - Una Noche by Lucy Mulloy
 Silver Audience Award - Call Girl by Mikael Marcimain
Lifetime Awards
 Stockholm Achievement Award - Willem Dafoe
 Stockholm Lifetime Achievement Award - Jan Troell
 Stockholm Visionary Award - Jacques Audiard

References

External links 
Official Site (in English)

2012 film festivals
2012 in Swedish cinema
2010s in Stockholm
Stockholm International Film Festival